This article details the international fixtures and results of the Philippines national football team.

Fixtures and results

2020s

2010s

2000s

1980-1999

1950-1979

Prior to 1948

References

External links
Philippines – Fixtures & Results at FIFA.com
Philippines – World football elo ratings at EloRatings.net  (Includes past fixtures & results)